The Matro (2,171 m) is a mountain of the Swiss Lepontine Alps, overlooking Giornico in the canton of Ticino. It lies at the southern end of the chain separating the main Leventina valley from the Blenio valley. An antenna is located on the summit.

References

External links
 Matro on Hikr
 Matro on Summitpost

Mountains of the Alps
Mountains of Switzerland
Mountains of Ticino
Lepontine Alps